An isoscape is a geologic map of isotope distribution. It is a spatially explicit prediction of elemental isotope ratios (δ) that is produced by executing process-level models of elemental isotope fractionation or distribution in a geographic information system (GIS).

The word isoscape is derived from isotope landscape and was first coined by Jason B. West.

Isoscapes of hydrogen, carbon, oxygen, nitrogen, strontium and sulfur have been used to answer scientific or forensic questions regarding the sources, partitioning, or provenance of natural and synthetic materials or organisms via their isotopic signatures. These include questions about migration, Earth's element cycles, human water use, climate, archaeological reconstructions, forensic science, and pollution.  Isoscapes of hydrogen and oxygen isotopes of precipitation, surface water, groundwater, and tap water have been developed to better understand the water cycle at regional to global scales.

See also
Isotope geochemistry

Notes

Isotopes
Geographic information systems
Map types